Rhonda Lee Quaresma was a Canadian professional female bodybuilder and International Federation of BodyBuilding & Fitness (IFBB) competitor.

Early life and career
Rhonda Lee Quaresma was born in Kingston, Ontario, Canada. In an interview, she says post-puberty weight gain and the encouragement of her family, especially from her father, was what drove her initial interest in fitness. She lived in Toronto, Ontario, Canada and frequently visits Los Angeles, California as a Professional Bodybuilder and Personal Trainer.

Quaresma made her debut in the Kingston Open in 1989, placing first in the lightweight division. After a series of successful amateur competitions on the Canadian tier system, Quaresma In 1995, she won the title of Miss Canada in the Canadian Nationals Level-4, placing first in the middleweight division of the and was overall winner; the win also secured Quaresma as a professional bodybuilder,  earning her IFBB Pro card after winning the Canadian Nationals through the Canadian Bodybuilding Federation (CBBF).

Quaresma's International Federation of Bodybuilding (IFBB) debut was the 1998 Jan Tana Classic, placing 13th out of 28 women, making the comparison rounds with the event’s winner.  She last competed in 2016 IFBB Pro Ferrigno Legacy in the Women's Physique category.

She returned to physique-exhibition events and last competed in 2016 IFBB Pro Ferrigno Legacy in the Women's Physique category. She is currently retired from bodybuilding competitions.

Rhonda Lee Quaresma is also a private trainer and nutrition tech certified by 'PROPTA: The professional personal trainers association.'

In 2011, Quaresma was arrested in a prostitution sting in Florida. Using the name “Miss Sparkle”, she met with an undercover police officer posing as a client. She was released on bond.

Illness and Death 
Rhonda Lee died after a three year battle with colon cancer on November 26, 2021. News of her passing was confirmed on her Instagram account by a long time friend.

Post-Retirement 
Rhonda Lee retired from bodybuilding competition in 2016 for health reasons. She has since opened up about her cancer on her youtube channel in 2020.

In 2018 she turned her love for Art into her next career along with still working as a personal trainer and active in bodybuilding.RLQ Sparkle Art

Bodybuilding competition history
Kingston Open Level-1 1989 1st Place LW 101 lbs (amateur open).
Ottawa Open Level-1 1990 1st Place LW 103 lbs (amateur open).
Ontario Eastern Regional Level-2 1992 1st Place LW 105 lbs (amateur regional).
All Ontario Level-3 1993 1st Place LW 110.5 lbs (amateur provincials).
Canadian Nationals Level-4 1995 1st Place MW 121 lbs. (amateur nationals)
Jan Tana Classic 1998 13th Place 128 lbs.(professional International)
Night of Champions 2003 14th place (Pro International)
Toronto Pro Show 2012 (pro physique) 13th place
Titans Grand Prix (Pro Physique) 16th place
Ferrigno Legacy 2016 16th place (Pro physique)

References

External links
Official website 
 

1968 births
Living people
Canadian female bodybuilders
Fitness and figure competitors
Franco-Ontarian people
Professional bodybuilders
Sportspeople from Kingston, Ontario